Ballasalla railway station (Manx: Stashoon Raad Yiarn Valley Sallagh) is located in the village of Ballasalla in the south of the Isle of Man, close to the airport, and is served on a seasonal basis by the Isle of Man Railway. It forms part of the sole remaining section of the once extensive network (46 miles, 74 km) that operated across the island. Ballasalla was the usual crossing point for trains, making it popular with photographers, until the introduction of the 2015 timetable which saw all trains passing at Castletown and the effective closure of Ballasalla as a staffed station, save for special events.

Buildings

The original wooden railway station was built in 1874 (to the same design as that still extant at Santon, the next halt eastwards on the line). Being a market village the railway station soon acquired cattle docks and goods platforms.

The original building was demolished in 1985 and replaced by a brick building housing a small ticket office and waiting area, which was built in 1985 and was opened in 1986 by Jack Nivison, the former President of the Legislative Council of the Isle of Man and MHK for Middle. Before this, the railway station, like several intermediate stopping places on the line, did not provide passenger platforms. The new building, however, was built at platform height, and the platform was long enough for a five-coach train, later increased to seven. The railway station also has a stone-built water tower and crossing-keeper's hut; the latter was extensively modified to house the now-defunct mechanical railway station gates. A crossing-keeper's house on the other side of the road is now a private dwelling. In 2002 the opposite side of the line also received a full-length platform, which also serves the goods siding, and a modern bus shelter was also installed; the platform edging used had previously been employed for the former South Line departure roads at Douglas railway station and was retained for future use when lifted in 1979. There was also a goods shed on the site — a reused wooden building originally from the prisoner of war camp at Knockaloe near Peel, which was also served by the railway during the First World War. Although now extensively modernised and not really recognisable as the railway station that existed until 1985, it remains one of the most picturesque settings on the line and was popular with photographers who had the opportunity to take images of two trains at once. From 2001 to 2012 this railway station was the only crossing place in regular use on the line, as after timetable changes in 2001 there were no crossing trains at Castletown railway station. However, with the introduction of a more intensive high season timetable in 2012, with six trains each way instead of the usual four, some trains have once again been crossing at Castletown, and all trains from 2015.

Terminus

Prior to the nationalisation of the railway in 1978, the railway company tried some experiments to reduce expenditure to keep the railway alive. Ballasalla railway station was (for one season only) the terminus of the line: a short run between here and Port Erin was the only service in 1976. The previous year the line was shorter still, only offering travel between Port Erin and Castletown, and it was largely due to campaigning by locals that services extended this far. The Isle of Man Steam Railway Supporters' Association led a campaign to have the line fully reinstated. In 1977 the entire line opened once more, and has remained open ever since on a seasonal basis. Before 1977, many goods trains also terminated here, with the nearby local weekly mart being a busy local event. With the village being surrounded by farms, the mart provided a vital source of income for the railway and the facilities that featured here were a testament to its once bustling location. In 2010 the railway's inaugural Teddy Bears' Picnic special trains were also based here, although train services operated through to Port Erin as normal rather than dedicated trains terminating here. With its run round facilities and water tower, the railway station is occasionally used for special hire services that connect with the local hostelry. Everyday service trains however do not terminate here, but all halt.

Crossings

When the railway arrived here the road was little more than a pack-horse road; at its intersection with the railway, traditional level crossing gates were installed. A gatekeeper's house and small lodge were also built; these both still stand: the former is now a private house, whilst the latter remains extant though out of use. It was not until the 1960s that the wooden manually operated gates were replaced with far larger mechanical gates, and the small gate lodge modified to accommodate the "wheelhouse", a small signal box-type structure in a position above the road to increase visibility for the person operating the gates. A series of inter-connected rods beneath the road protected by large metal plates were also extant, but when the whole crossing was relaid in 2000 these were removed and a standard concrete crossing installed. These gates were opened and closed by a large ship's wheel structure which remains in situ. These distinctive gates were a feature of the line and survived until 2001 when, in line with a health and safety ruling, they were removed and replaced with automatic barriers which are now operated by the railway station staff from the platform for departing trains and by treadle activated by trains approaching from a southerly direction. The barriers now in operation tower above the site when in the "off" position; they are long enough to block both carriageways when in use. The crossing is also protected by colour lights to warn motorists of approaching trains, and a set of repeater lights on the exit to Silverburn Way further alert motorists approaching from the south.

Silverdale

This railway station serves the local attraction of Silverdale Glen, a small pleasure park with its own boating pool and water-powered merry-go-round with refreshment rooms. This is a 15-minute walk from the railway station and was once very popular, making the railway station busy. The attraction is open throughout the year and is a popular destination for model boat enthusiasts who use the shallow boating lake out of season. In season there are both rowing boats and hand-operated pedal boats, popular for many years. In the past there was also a large indoor model railway layout here, with coin-operated trains. There was also a grotto-type walk-through feature with illuminated gnomes in a forest environment. Today the cafe and restaurant are a popular stopping off point. The tree-lined glen that joins the village and the pleasure park has a wishing well and leads directly to the other nearby attraction, part of the Story of Mann located at Rushen Abbey. Some paths in this area form part of the Millennium Way, a long public right of way created in 1979 to celebrate 1000 years of the island's parliament. It climbs beyond this point towards the centre of the island.

Rushen Abbey

The national heritage site at Rushen Abbey is also a short walk from the railway station; once a popular venue for dancing and famed for its cream teas, it later became the Academy nightclub and fell into disrepair before being developed as a major historical attraction. The earliest origins of the site can be dated to the 10th century when Savignac monks from Furness Abbey established a site here, later falling to Cistercian rule when the two orders merged. The nearby abbey church is dedicated to St. Mary but is approximately one hundred years younger than the abbey proper. Dissolved by the 16th century, by the early 19th century the ruins were marketed as a tourist destination served by the railway and famous for the strawberries and cream before the Second World War. After several years in different guises it was bought by Manx National Heritage in 1998 and excavated over the following years. It is now a heritage site and one that is popular with rail travellers when open (between April and October). A small visitors interpretation centre leads to the abbey gardens where there are interactive displays as well as audio and video material. An area designated for children is also available, where you can build a monks' arch among other activities. The popularity of this attraction is such that signs on the platform alert passengers that it is the correct railway station to alight to visit it. A further large sign in the car park gives details of the directions to the site.

Environs

Above the railway station to the west are the crossings serving Ballahick and Ballawoods farms; these were until 2001 staffed by seasonal gatekeepers but the installation of automatic barriers saw this practice discontinued. The office development that adjoins the station was once the extensive goods yard. This was sold off to create developments in 1985, when the original station building dating from 1874 was demolished. A row of local authority housing appears to the south-west of the railway station next to the level crossing keeper's hut; beyond this is the Silverburn Estate, a housing development dating from the late 1960s and early 1970s. Beyond this are the village pub (the Whitestone), a few shops, post office, primary school and a nursing home. In the village are the offices of the local authority, Malew Parish Commissioners. An industrial estate on the site of the nearby Balthane Farm is home to a number of local businesses and also provides access to the runways and a footpath to the beach. The name of the village is from the Manx language Balley Sallagh, "Place of Willow", and there are many willow trees in the surrounding area.

Friends Of...
In early 2019 a volunteer group was established in conjunction with the Isle of Man Steam Railway Supporters' Association and the local authority Malew Parish Commissioners with a view to adopting the station, tending to the floral displays in the summer months and otherwise enhancing the site.  The intention is to follow the precedent set by the Friends Of Castletown Station with working parties on site regularly as a community scheme similar to those provided elsewhere along the line, it being commented that the general upkeep of the station had deteriorated since it became an unstaffed site.  Floral displays have been expanded upon since the group was formed each season and 2021 saw the provision of more period platform furniture to enhance the site as well as more appropriate signage supplied by the Supporters' Association.

Routes

See also
 Isle of Man Railway stations
 Isle of Man Railway level crossings and points of interest
 Isle of Man Steam Railway Supporters' Association
 Ballasalla

References

External links 
 Ballasalla Station
 Isle Of Man Guide
 Online Reference Guide

Railway stations in the Isle of Man
Railway stations opened in 1874
1874 establishments in the Isle of Man